Troy University is a public university in Troy, Alabama. It was founded in 1887 as Troy State Normal School within the Alabama State University System, and is now the flagship university of the Troy University System. Troy University is accredited by the Southern Association of Colleges and Schools Commission on Colleges (SACS) to award associate, baccalaureate, master's, education specialist, and doctoral degrees.

In August 2005, Troy State University, Montgomery; Troy State University, Phenix City; Troy State University, Dothan; and Troy State University (main campus) all merged under one accreditation to become Troy University. Prior to the merger, each campus was independently accredited. The merger combined staff, faculty, and administrators into a single university.

Today, the university serves the educational needs of students in four Alabama campuses and 60 teaching sites in 17 U.S. states and 11 countries. Troy University has over 100,000 alumni in 50 states of the U.S. and in other countries.

History
Troy University is a public university with its main campus located in Troy, Alabama. It was founded as a normal school in 1887 with a mission to educate and train new teachers. Over time, the school evolved into a four-year college and in 1957 the Alabama Board of Education adopted the name "Troy State College" and granted it the right to issue master's degrees. In the 1960s the college opened satellite sites in Montgomery, Phenix City, and Dothan to serve the military personnel posted at Maxwell AFB, Fort Benning and Fort Rucker. More sites associated with military centers located throughout the United States and abroad followed in the subsequent decades. As a leader in online education, Troy University began offering online courses in the Fall Semester of 1997. Troy University is known for its innovation in offering in-class and online academic programs in servicing traditional, nontraditional, and military students. In spring 2018, Troy University was ranked #19 among the "Most Innovative Schools" in U.S. News & World Report annual peer assessment survey. The main campus enrollment as of the fall of 2016 is 7,911 students. The campus consists of 36 major buildings on  plus the adjacent Troy University Arboretum.

At least three prominent political figures have been associated with Troy University. George Wallace Jr., son of the late Governor George C. Wallace, who is a former administrator at the university. Max Rafferty, the California Superintendent of Public Instruction from 1963 to 1971, was dean of the education department from 1971 until his death in 1982. Former Governor John Malcolm Patterson taught U.S. history at the institution during the 1980s.

Name change
On April 16, 2004, the Board of Trustees voted to change the name of the institution from Troy State University to Troy University. The transition to the new name was completed in August 2005 and was the fourth in the school's history. When created by the Alabama Legislature on February 26, 1887, it was officially named the Troy State Normal School. The school was located in downtown Troy until moving to the present location on University Avenue in 1930. In 1929, the name was changed to Troy State Teachers College and it subsequently conferred its first baccalaureate degree in 1931. In 1957, the legislature voted both to change the name to Troy State College and to allow it to begin a master's degree program. The name was changed once again in 1967 to Troy State University.

Troy University System
The Troy University System (formerly known as the Troy State University System) is a public university system in Alabama that coordinates and oversees the three branch universities of Troy University. The system was formed in 1982, as the campuses in Dothan and Montgomery were granted independent accreditation status. In April 2004, "State" was dropped from the university's name to reflect the institution's new, broader focus. In August 2005, all Troy campuses were unified under one accreditation.

Troy University has a total of four campuses located across the state of Alabama:
 Troy University (main campus)
 Troy University at Montgomery
 Troy University at Dothan
 Troy University at Phenix City

In addition to the four campuses, there are also 23 additional support sites across the southeastern United States and other countries.

Academics

Structure
Troy University cumulatively offers 46 bachelor's degree programs, 22 master's degree programs, and 3 doctoral programs.

Schools/colleges

The university is composed of five colleges, a graduate school, and a division of general studies:

College of Arts & Sciences
College of Communications & Fine Arts
College of Education
College of Health & Human Services
The Sorrell College of Business
The Graduate School
The Division of General Studies

Confucius Institute

Established in 2007, the Confucius Institute at Troy University is a public institution affiliated with the Ministry of Education of the People's Republic of China, funded and arranged in part by Hanban, which is itself affiliated with the Chinese government, and the stated aim of which is to promote the Chinese language and culture, support local Chinese teaching, and facilitate cultural exchanges. The institute also offers summer camps for high school students, consultation for economic development, and promotion of Chinese outreach programs. Some have expressed concerns related to academic freedom and political influence of the Chinese government specially regarding such things as the comment of a former senior Chinese official, Li Changchun that Confucius Institutes are "an important part of China's overseas propaganda set-up". Troy University was the first college in Alabama to open a Confucius Institute.

Center for International Programs
The university has over 800 international students from 75 countries on the main campus, and offers special programs for students such as the English as Second Language Center (ECL). Troy also has a dormitory named Pace Hall.

Rankings and reputation

In 2018, Troy University's overall acceptance rate was 91%, and the on-time graduation rate was 35%. In 2018, 58% of the freshman class had to take remedial courses in English and mathematics. Troy University considers, but does not require, SAT or ACT scores for admission.

Troy University has acquired different institutional rankings from various sources:

In 2019, Forbes ranked Troy as the 640th-best school in the nation. Forbes overall ranking centers on the value of the degree obtained by a university's students and measures, in part, the marketplace success of a school's graduate.
U.S. News & World Report in several categories for Regional Universities, South Region, for 2020:

Campus

Troy University's main campus is located near downtown Troy. The campus sits along rolling hills with many old oak trees present along the streets and throughout campus. The first two buildings that were built on campus were John Robert Lewis Hall (formerly Bibb Graves Hall) and Shackelford Hall, both of which are still standing on campus today. Bibb Graves, who was Alabama's governor at the time of the building's dedication, is remembered for commissioning the Olmsted Brothers architectural firm of Brookline, Massachusetts, to design the campus landscape plan. The Troy University Board of Trustees voted to rename the hall in John Lewis's honor on August 26, 2020.

Across from the chapel is a very small lake named Lake Lagoona, which is the drainage point of the creek that runs through the Trojan Oaks Golf Course.

The Trojan Oaks Golf Practice Course, which used to be full-service, 9-hole, 3,211-yard golf course, is one of the pristine features of the campus with its rolling hills, oak and pine trees, and a creek running through most of the course. Troy was one of only 87 universities in the United States to have operate a full-service golf course on its own campus before closing the course and revamping it into a golf practice facility, and is still one of the few schools to operate a 9-hole or greater practice course on its campus.

One of the favorite features of the campus is Janice Hawkins Park, which features an amphitheater, walking trails, a lagoon and several prominent art installations. Paved sidewalks curve throughout that park, and a pedestrian bridge straddles the lagoon on one end. Among the art installations are the "Violata Pax Dove", by the artist Fred "Nall" Hollis, and 200 replica terracotta warriors that are spread throughout the park, representing the famous excavations in China.

Student life

Student body

Residence halls

Students who live on campus at Troy have a choice of 12 different residential halls to choose from:

 Clements Hall (coed by floor)
 Gardner Hall (men)
 Hamil Hall (women)
 Honors Cottage (coed)
 Newman Center (coed by floor)
 Pace Hall (coed by floor)
 Rushing Hall (formerly New Residence) (coed by building)
 Shackelford Hall (coed by floor)
 Trojan Village (coed by floor)
 University Apartments (coed)

Trojan Dining Hall
The Trojan Dining Hall is a large, two-story state-of-the-art dining hall with a restaurant-style collection of venues. Some of the restaurants inside the dining hall include a Boar's Head Deli, Moe's Southwest Grill, The Wild Mushroom, Bella Trattoria, Flying Star Diner, Basic Kneads Artisan Bakery, and Magellan's.

The hall also features an outdoor dining area with a large fountain.

Trojan Center
The Trojan Center is the activity center on campus for students. It features a movie theater, meeting rooms, gathering spaces, large ballrooms, the Barnes & Noble campus bookstore, Starbucks, mail room, student activity offices, and a food court that features restaurants such as Chick-fil-A, Steak 'n Shake, Einstein Bros. Bagels, Mein Bowl, Great American Cookies, and Marble Slab Creamery.

Recreation

Many recreational activities are available on campus. The Trojan Fitness Center offers fitness machines, free weights, and cardiovascular machines. Trojan Games recreation room has two billiard tables, two table tennis tables, and a foosball game. The Natatorium houses an eight-lane  Olympic-style pool. The Recreation Center Gym has two basketball courts, a cardio room, a dance room, and a large outside pool. Wright Hall Gym, located adjacent to the Natatorium, offers a basketball court, two volleyball courts, and four badminton courts. The Intramural Fields consist of four flag football fields, two softball fields, and one soccer field.

Trojan Arena, the newest facility on campus, is the home to the basketball, volleyball, and track programs, as well as being used for the university's commencement ceremonies and other special events with seating capacity of 6,000. The new Trojan Arena replaces the university's longtime basketball and events facility, Sartain Hall, which opened in 1962. Trojan Arena is equipped with 5,600 chair-back seats and several VIP suites and boxes. Beyond the normal concession area is a food court-style lounge and a simulated court area on the concourse. The arena includes seven upper-level suites and an exclusive Stadium Club area for donors, while also adding floor seating for students. Among the latest technology features of the new arena is a three-tiered rotunda at the main entrance, an interior concourse with concession stands, and a food court-styled dining center with various specialty food items. It features an LED ribbon board that panoramically encircles the entire arena with two  video boards that enhances the total sports gaming experience, the only one of its kind in the Sun Belt Conference. The Trojan Arena is also home to the Troy University Sports Hall of Fame, with digital displays of its honored members located adjacent to the rotunda.

The campus also features a natatorium that includes a 9-lane, Olympic-sized swimming pool.

The university is currently in the middle of building an exclusive $25 million recreation center for students. The  facility will be located in the area formerly known as the Sartain Hall parking lot, near George Wallace Drive. Once completed, the building will house a multi-activity court, a basketball court, a free-weight training area, a circuit weight training area, special aerobic rooms, an outdoor swimming pool, a multi-level walking track and four offices.

Greek life
Twenty-three traditional Greek organizations are on Troy's campus. In 2019, about 10% of undergraduate men and 13% of undergraduate women were active in Troy's Greek system. Troy's IFC and NPC organizations have traditional Greek housing for members use.

Gamma Phi Delta Christian Fraternity

Music organizations
These six music organizations function under the supervision of the John M. Long School of Music:
 Phi Mu Alpha
 Kappa Kappa Psi
 Sigma Alpha Iota
 Tau Beta Sigma
 Phi Boota Roota
 cNAfME, a student affiliate of the National Association for Music Education

Student media
The school newspaper, the Tropolitan (commonly referred to as "The Trop"), is located on the bottom floor of Wallace Hall. It is a weekly publication, written and produced entirely by students. The Palladium is located in adjacent offices in the same building. The Tropolitan has been ranked as one of the best college newspapers in the country, and was ranked as the #6 Best College Newspaper by the Southeast Journalism Conference (SEJC) in 2017.

Also located in Wallace Hall is Troy University Television, also referred to as Troy TrojanVision. Troy University Television broadcasts three live entirely student-produced newscasts twice daily. TrojanVision Global News, TrojanVision Midday & TrojanVision Nightly News. Troy TrojanVision also produces a 30-minute sports show, Trojan Sports Now, every week. TrojanVision streams live online and can be seen at the university's YouTube page. Some of the students that major in broadcasting also help to produce ESPN sporting events for the university, including football, basketball, and baseball games.

in 2017, TrojanVision was ranked as the #1 Best College TV Station by the Southeast Journalism Conference (SEJC).

The "Sound of the South" marching band

The Sound of the South is the official marching band of Troy University. The marching band was established in 1939 and has been referred to by its current name since 1965. The band was named by John M. Long soon after he was hired as band director. The band, now boasting over 300 members on a regular basis, has enjoyed major success in performing at hundreds of marching band competitions, as well as dozens of different college and professional athletic venues. The band usually follows the football team to almost every away game, and has a smaller pep-band that plays at every home basketball game. It was during the thirty-two year tenure of Johnny Long, as he was commonly referred to, that the band program at Troy University established a prominent national reputation through its many featured appearances at music conventions, concert tours and recordings with the symphony band, as well as several nationally televised appearances with the "Sound of the South" Marching Band. The band's "trademark" piece that is played before every performance of the band is called "The Fanfare" and was written by John M. Long in 1965.

Athletics

Troy State Normal School began its sports program in 1909, when it fielded its first football team. Through the early years, Troy's athletics nicknames were not official and varied by the sport and the coach. Eventually, teams all began to use the name "Troy State Teachers", but when the athletic teams moved into NAIA competition, the nickname was then changed to the "Red Wave". In the early 1970s, the student body voted to change the name to Trojans after many felt that Red Wave was too similar to the University of Alabama's nickname, the Crimson Tide. Prior to becoming a member of NCAA Division I athletics in 1993, Troy University was a member of the Gulf South Conference of the NCAA Division II ranks. Troy's primary rivals were Jacksonville State University, Livingston University (now the University of West Alabama), and the University of North Alabama. In 2004, Troy joined the Sun Belt Conference of the Football Bowl Subdivision.

Football

Troy University began playing football in 1909. The program has won three national championships, the NAIA national football championship in 1968, and the NCAA Division II national football championship in 1984 and 1987. Troy transitioned to the NCAA's Division I-A in 2001, became a football only member of the Sun Belt Conference in 2004, and joined the conference for all other sports in 2005. In 2001, Troy defeated Mississippi State at Scott Field in Starkville, Mississippi, by a score of 21–9 which was the Trojans' first victory over a BCS level program. In 2004, the Trojans defeated a ranked BCS program for the first time ever, defeating #17 Missouri 24–14 at home on ESPN2. The Trojan football team made its first bowl game appearance in the Silicon Valley Football Classic on December 30, 2004, but lost to Northern Illinois, 34–21. In 2006, Troy won the Sun Belt Conference for the first time after defeating Middle Tennessee State toward the end of the 2006 season. Troy represented the Sun Belt Conference in the 2006 New Orleans Bowl as the conference champion for the first time where the Trojans defeated the Rice Owls of Conference USA by a score of 41–17. Troy participated in the 2010 New Orleans Bowl where the Trojans routed Ohio by a score of 48–21. Troy has most recently participated in the 2016 Dollar General Bowl in Mobile, Alabama, which the Trojans won over Ohio 28–23.
Former Troy football head coach Larry Blakeney served 25 seasons as head coach between 1990 and the end of the 2014 season. He has led the program to three Southland Football Conference titles and five Sun Belt Conference titles, as well as guided the Trojans to seven FCS playoff appearances and five FBS bowl games. Blakeney boasts an overall record of 178–113–1 as head coach at Troy. Blakeney is the winningest coach in the Troy University history and he is the 4th-winningest collegiate coach all time in the state of Alabama, only behind Paul "Bear" Bryant, Cleve Abbott, and Ralph "Shug" Jordan. Blakeney is one of two coaches in college football history to be the head coach of a football program during its transition from Division II to I-A (the other being UCF's Gene McDowell).

Basketball
The Troy University men's basketball team was under the direction of head coach Don Maestri for 31 years until his retirement in 2013. Coach Maestri is the winningest coach in school history, with exactly 500 career wins, and he has won numerous conference coach-of-the-year awards during his tenure at Troy University. The program has won 11 conference championships in basketball, with six of them coming in the Division I era. On January 12, 1992, Troy defeated DeVry University of Atlanta by the score of 258–141 (or 253–141, according to some journalists). This is the highest-scoring game in NCAA basketball history and Troy State's score of 258 is the highest score in NCAA basketball history. The Trojans competed in the 2003 NCAA Tournament in Nashville against Xavier University after winning the Atlantic Sun Conference title. In 2004, Troy was an NIT participant in a match-up against Niagara University. In 2008, coach Maestri was inducted into the Wiregrass Sports Hall of Fame at a ceremony in Dothan, Alabama. In 2009, the Trojans finished 3rd place in the Sun Belt Conference and competed in the CBI against College of Charleston. After winning the Sun Belt regular-season title in 2010, the Trojans would be invited to play in the NIT once again against Ole Miss. Maestri is a member of the Troy University Sports Hall of Fame.

Maestri was replaced by Phil Cunningham on March 26, 2013.

The Troy University women's basketball team is currently under the direction of head coach Chanda Rigby, a junior college standout and coaching veteran. The previous coach was Craig Kennedy.

Baseball
The Troy University baseball team won two Division II national championships in 1986 and 1987 under the leadership of coach Chase Riddle. One of Troy's biggest victories in baseball came in April 1998 when the Trojans knocked off the #3 nationally ranked University of Alabama Crimson Tide by a score of 8–4 at Riddle-Pace Field on the Troy campus. Under the direction of current head coach Bobby Pierce, the Trojan baseball program has competed in the NCAA Baseball Tournament in 2006 and 2007. Troy also competed in the 1995 and 1997 NCAA Division One tournament under head coach John Mayotte. In 1999, the program tied the NCAA Division I record for most hits in the 6th inning, belting 14 hits (in the 6th) in a 34–4 rout of Stetson.

Rodeo
The program's governing body is the National Intercollegiate Rodeo Association. The rodeo program's home facility is the Pike County Cattlemen's Arena in Troy where it hosts a three-day rodeo each October that features college rodeo programs from throughout the southern region of the United States. Troy University calf roper Ben Mayworth won the 2007 national title in Casper, Wyoming, at the National Finals Collegiate Rodeo.

Women's soccer
The Troy University women's soccer team began in 2003 when the stadium, Jesse H. Colley Track/Soccer Stadium, was first constructed, seating 500. Later, in 2010, the stadium was renovated to include a press box to be used by both the track and soccer team. The field, costing around $1 million to build, measures about 115 yards by 75 yards. The team plays in the Sun Belt Conference, along with: South Alabama, Georgia State, Coastal Carolina, Appalachian State, Georgia Southern, Arkansas State, Louisiana, Texas State, Little Rock, and ULM. Though, they are currently last in the east division with four conference points, compared to the leader's, South Alabama's, twenty-four points. Currently the team is led by head coach Ged O'Connor, and assistant coaches Nicole Waters and the new addition Kayla Saager. Ged O'Connor, hired in January 2017, is just the seventh head coach in this program's history. O'Connor had prior experience to coaching from being the head coach of the Saint Leo University women's soccer team for eleven seasons. Furthermore, Nicole Waters will enter her third season with the Troy University women's soccer program come fall of 2021. Before Troy, Waters was a graduate assistant at Mercer University for two seasons. She is a Canada native, but after her collegiate career at Dayton, coach Waters played professionally at FC Slovacko Zeny of the Czech Republican league. The newly hired Kayla Saager joined the Trojans in 2020. Her soccer experience includes playing at three colleges in her career (NC State, West Virginia, and Binghamton). Saager will be held responsible for coaching the Troy University's attacking side, specifically.

Campus academic features

Hall of Fame of Distinguished Band Conductors
The Hall of Fame of Distinguished Band Conductors was established on the campus of what was then known as Troy State University in Troy, Alabama by the National Band Association in 1979. The Hall of Fame contains the picture and biographies of band directors who have distinguished themselves in some way or who have made significant contributions to the field of band directing, conducting, or leadership.

The Manuel H. Johnson Center for Political Economy
Troy University's Manuel H. Johnson Center for Political Economy was formed in September, 2010 as the result of a $3.6 million gift from Troy alumnus Dr. Manuel H. Johnson, BB&T, and the Charles G. Koch Charitable Foundation. The center's mission is the advancement of free market economic ideas and its research and teaching efforts explore the idea that economic freedom improves the quality of life for citizens. The new center is part of the university's Sorrell College of Business and it is housed inside Bibb Graves Hall. Dr. Scott Beaulier served as the center's executive director from 2010 to 2015.

University libraries
The libraries on the Dothan, Montgomery, and Troy campuses house collections of more than 500,000 bound volumes, 40,000 media items, and nearly 1 million items in micro-form. The Troy University Library on the Troy campus is a Federal Depository Library.

Janice Hawkins Cultural Arts Park
The Janice Hawkins Cultural Arts Park is a  park on the Troy University campus that features an amphitheater, walking trails, a lagoon and the International Arts Center, which houses two art galleries and an interpretive center known as Warriors Unearthed. In addition, there are 200 replica terracotta warriors designed by the artist Huo Bao Zhu that are displayed throughout the park in exhibits representing the historic excavations in China. It is built in the honor of Mrs. Janice Hawkins.

Center for Materials and Manufacturing Sciences
The university was recently awarded a $3.2 million grant from NIST to establish the Center for Materials and Manufacturing Sciences, a facility for research in recycling of plastic materials. The establishment of the center will facilitate and enhance Troy University's partnership with the local plastic recycling industry in order to increase competitiveness in the marketplace. This will assist in improving and increasing job creation in Pike County. The assistance of Senator Shelby (R-Ala) was instrumental in obtaining the funding for this venture.

Notable alumni

References

External links

 
 Troy University athletics website

 
Public universities and colleges in Alabama
Buildings and structures in Pike County, Alabama
Educational institutions established in 1887
Education in Houston County, Alabama
Education in Pike County, Alabama
Education in Russell County, Alabama
Universities and colleges accredited by the Southern Association of Colleges and Schools
1887 establishments in Alabama